Yalchino (Yalsı) is a rural locality (a village) in Irtyubyaksky Selsoviet, Kugarchinsky District, Bashkortostan, Russia. The population was 161 as of 2010.

Geography 
It is located 24 km from Mrakovo and 4 km from Semyono-Petrovskoye.

References 

Rural localities in Kugarchinsky District